Nick Reding may refer to:

 Nick Reding (actor) (born 1962), British actor
 Nick Reding (journalist), American journalist